The following is a list of Irish counties' coats of arms. In the majority of cases these are arms assigned to county councils created by the Local Government (Ireland) Act 1898 or later legislation, either by the Chief Herald of Ireland in what is now the Republic of Ireland or by the College of Arms in Northern Ireland. All but two county councils in the Republic have a coat of arms. In Northern Ireland county councils were abolished in 1973, but the traditional arms are still occasionally used.

The arms of the county town have sometimes been used as an unofficial symbol of a county instead of those of its county council, or when the council had no arms. There are no official county flags. Flags with the GAA county colours serve as de facto county flags. County flags flown at Dublin Castle incorporate the county council arms, while those sold by the GAA county board include the county GAA crest. Coats of arms granted in recent decades often incorporate the GAA colours in the field.

History

The earliest Irish county arms date from the late 17th century, when those of counties Carlow, Kilkenny and "Typerary" were recorded by Richard Carney, Ulster King of Arms. In each case the arms consist of an ermine shield bearing a fesse or central horizontal band on which heraldic devices of local families are displayed. The arms of Tipperary became obsolete when the county was divided into North and South Ridings in 1838.

When county councils were established in 1899, each was obliged to adopt a seal. In some cases these used an unofficial coat of arms, but no arms were officially granted prior to the splitting of heraldic jurisdiction in 1943.

In 1914 a system of county and city flags were designed as unit colours for the Irish Volunteers. Each county flag was to include a coat of arms, with a list of suggested designs drawn by The O'Rahilly. While few of these colours were ever manufactured, some of the county devices were later to occur in official grants.

Grants by the Chief Herald of Ireland
With the establishment of the Genealogical Office in 1943, a native Irish heraldic jurisdiction was established. One of the earliest grants by the new office was to Dublin County Council on 30 September 1944. The grant was notable for its use of Norse symbolism and the motto in the Irish language. In 1949 Edward MacLysaght, the Chief Herald, discovered the 17th century arms of counties Carlow and Kilkenny, and wrote to the county councils concerned informing them of their existence. From 1956 there was a steady flow of grants to county councils. In 1990 Tipperary South Riding County Council was granted arms based on those recorded by Richard Carney.

Grants by the College of Arms
In 1943 heraldic jurisdiction in Northern Ireland passed to the College of Arms in London, with the creation of the merged office of Norroy and Ulster King of Arms. Five out of the six county councils received grants of arms from London. In each case supporters were also granted. In all cases these arms became obsolete with the abolition of county councils by the Local Government Act (Northern Ireland) 1972.

State

Present

Republic of Ireland

Northern Ireland

Historical

Provinces

Present

Joint symbol

The provincial arms are popularly displayed together, quartered as a coat of arms of all-island Ireland. This symbol, as well as the flag equivalent, are used by various all-Ireland sports teams and cultural organisations. The order in which the flags appear varies. The flag and its variations are currently used by many organizations in Ireland, especially those that operate in an all-Ireland context, for example the Ireland rugby league team. Other teams use variations of the flag, including the Irish hockey team, the Irish rugby union team and the Irish Amateur Boxing Association.

Historical

Counties

Present

Former

Towns and Cities

See also
Coat of arms of Ireland
Irish heraldry
Cross-border flag for Ireland

References

Ireland